The 2018–19 season is Brescia Calcio's 109th in existence and eighth consecutive season in Serie B, the second tier of Italian football.

David Suazo was appointed manager of the club in June 2018 .  He was let go on September 18 after three league matches.  He was replaced by Eugenio Corini.

On May 1, 2019, Brescia were promoted to Serie A for the 2019–20 season.

Players

Squad information
Players and squad numbers last updated on 2 February 2019. Appearances include league matches only.Note: Flags indicate national team as has been defined under FIFA eligibility rules. Players may hold more than one non-FIFA nationality.

Transfers

Pre-season and friendlies

Competitions

Serie B

League table

Results summary

Results by round

Matches

Coppa Italia

Statistics

Appearances and goals

|-
! colspan=14 style=background:#DCDCDC; text-align:center| Goalkeepers

|-
! colspan=14 style=background:#DCDCDC; text-align:center| Defenders

|-
! colspan=14 style=background:#DCDCDC; text-align:center| Midfielders

|-
! colspan=14 style=background:#DCDCDC; text-align:center| Forwards

Goalscorers

Clean sheets

Disciplinary record

References

Brescia Calcio seasons
Brescia